PowWow (Power Optimized Hardware and Software FrameWork for Wireless Motes) is a wireless sensor network (WSN) mote developed by the Cairn team of IRISA/INRIA.  The platform is currently based on IEEE 802.15.4 standard radio transceiver and on an MSP430 microprocessor. Unlike other available mote systems, PowWow offers specific features for a very-high energy efficiency:
 the MAC layer is based on an asynchronous rendezvous scheme initiated by the receiver,
 architectural and circuit level optimizations were performed such as power management, frequency and voltage scaling and FPGA co-processing for low power,
 the software stack is very light (5 kbytes) uses event-driven programming and is currently derived from the Protothread library of Contiki.

Hardware
PowWow hardware platform is composed of a motherboard including an MSP430 microcontroller and of other daughter boards such as the radio transceiver board, the coprocessing board and some sensor and energy harvester boards.

Processing motherboard
 TI MSP430 low-power microcontroller
 MSP430F1612 version, 8 MHz clock
 55KB of flash memory, 5KB of on-chip RAM
 330uA at 1 MHz and 2.2 V in active mode, 1.1uA in standby mode
 P1, P2 connectors for extension
 JTAG, RS232 and I2C interfaces

Radio Board
 TI CC2420 RF transceiver
Digital direct sequence spread spectrum baseband modem
 Single-chip 2.4 GHz IEEE 802.15.4 compliant
 Spreading gain of 9 dB, data rate of 250 kbit/s
 Hardware support for packet handling, data buffering, burst transmissions, data encryption, data authentication, clear channel assessment, link quality indication and packet timing information

Co-processing Board
A co-processing board can be added to the motherboard on P1, P2 connectors. This board provides dynamic voltage scaling and hardware acceleration to increase the energy efficiency of the network.
 Power Mode Management (PMM)
 Low-Power Programmable Timer for Wake-up period
 MAX6370, 8uA
 Dynamic Voltage and Frequency Scaling (DFVS)
 Programmable Clock
 LTC6930, 490uA
 8 MHz divided by 1 to 128
 Programmable DC/DC converter
 TPS62402/TPS61030
 FPGA co-processing
 Low-power Igloo FPGA from Actel
 AGL125: 130 nm, 125 kgates, 32kbits on-chip RAM, 1 kbits Flash, PLL for clock management.
 Supply voltages 0 to 1.65V
 Power consumption: 2.2 uW, 16 uW, 1 to 30 mW in sleep, freeze, run modes
 e.g. Viterbi decoder for link layer implemented on the FPGA consumes 5 mW

Networking
 MAC layer: preamble sampling protocol
PowWow uses RICER protocol proposed by UC Berkeley to reduce the time spent in radio reception (RX) mode. This protocol consists in cycled rendez-vous initiated by a wake-up beacon from potential receivers. Thanks to this method, nodes are sleeping most of the time, hence saving energy.

 Multi-hop routing
 Geographical routing
PowWow uses a simple geographical routing protocol. 
 Each node has (x,y) coordinates
 Next node for hop transmission is chosen in the neighbors as the nearest to the destination
in the sense of Euclidean distance
 Neighbor table management
 A neighbor is a node in the radio range of a node
 Neighbors are discovered at power-up and on regular time period
 Transmission modes
Broadcast
Direct transmission to {neighbors}, no ACK
Flooding
Broadcast a packet to all network nodes, no ACK
Direct Hop with/without ACK
Direct transmission to a specific neighbors with/without ACK
Robust Multi-Hop
Multi-hop transmission to a specific node in the network
Each hop is with ACK
Uses node address

Software
PowWow software distribution provides an API organized into protocol layers (PHY, MAC, LINK, NET and APP). The software is based on the protothread library of Contiki, which provides a sequential control flow without complex state machines or full multi-threading.
Memory efficiency: 6 Kbytes (protocol layers) + 5 Kbytes (application)
Over-the-air re-programmation (and soon reconfiguration)

Development Tools
 Currently based on IAR Embedded Workbench
 Compiling with gcc for MSP430 is also possible
 Energy estimation methodology

Availability
The first version of PowWow were released July 2009. PowWow V1 includes the motherboard, the radio board and the software. A first prototype of the coprocessing board is currently available but not yet distributed. PowWow V2 is under development.

PowWow is delivered as an open-source hardware and open source software under the GPL license.

External links
Official website

Sources 

Wireless sensor network
Sensors